The Association of Young Irish Archaeologists, or AYIA was founded in Belfast in 1968 by a group of students from Queen's University Belfast.

Membership is automatic for individuals who are members of the AYIA's affiliated societies in the various universities, institutes and colleges around the country; however, recent graduate students and those relatively new to the profession are also eagerly encouraged to participate.

The AYIA governing council is elected annually from representatives from the University, Institute or College where the next conference is planned to take place.

The purpose of the association is to further communication and co-operation between interested parties, to provide a forum for new ideas and to foster interest and enthusiasm for archaeology at a 'junior' level in Ireland. As is clear from this, the use of the word 'young' is somewhat misleading as the AYIA's members may include individuals of any age who are undergraduates, postgraduates or relatively new to the profession and related disciplines.

The most important event that the AYIA runs is its annual conference which is held by one of the participating Universities within the Republic of Ireland or Northern Ireland. The conference usually consists of an opening lecture and wine reception on the Friday evening, followed by a day of twenty-minute lectures on the Saturday and a local field trip on the Sunday, the conference is often held in February or March.

The level of activity of the AYIA has fluctuated somewhat since its inception, demonstrated by the lack of an annual conference some years. The conference, however, is the association's main event and is hosted in rotation by the various student societies.

Participants 
Queen's University Belfast
University College Dublin
National University of Ireland, Galway
University College Cork
Trinity College Dublin
Institute of Technology, Sligo
University of Ulster

Representatives from the different archaeological companies in Ireland may also participate as can archaeologists who are not affiliated with any particular institution.

Location of the Annual Conference

External links 
 Official AYIA Website

Archaeological organizations
Archaeology of Ireland
Archaeology of Northern Ireland
Irish archaeologists
History organisations based in the Republic of Ireland